Nippia alboscutellata is a species of tephritid or fruit flies in the genus Nippia of the family Tephritidae.

References

Dacinae